Events in the year 1882 in Japan.

Incumbents
Monarch: Emperor Meiji

Governors
Aichi Prefecture: Renpei Kunisada
Akita Prefecture: Ishida Eikichi
Aomori Prefecture: Hidenori Yamada then Kanenori Goda
Ehime Prefecture: Shinpei Seki
Fukui Prefecture: Tsutomu Ishiguro
Fukushima Prefecture: Morisuke Yamayoshi then Michitsume Mishima
Gifu Prefecture: Toshi Kozaki
Gunma Prefecture: Katori Yoshihiko
Hiroshima Prefecture: Senda Sadaaki
Ibaraki Prefecture: Hitomi Katsutaro 
Iwate Prefecture: Korekiyo Shima
Kanagawa Prefecture: Baron Tadatsu Hayashi
Kochi Prefecture: Teru Tanabe then Ijuin Shizen 
Kumamoto Prefecture: Takaaki Tomioka
Kyoto Prefecture: Baron Kokudo Kitagaki
Mie Prefecture: Sadamedaka Iwamura  
Miyagi Prefecture: Matsudaira Masanao
Nagano Prefecture: Makoto Ono 
Niigata Prefecture: Nagayama Sheng Hui 
Oita Prefecture: Ryokichi Nishimura
Osaka Prefecture: Tateno Tsuyoshi
Saga Prefecture: Kamata
Saitama Prefecture: Tasuke Shirane then Kiyohide Yoshida
Shimane Prefecture: Jiro Sakai 
Tochigi Prefecture: Fujikawa
Tokyo: Earl Kensho Yoshikawa  
Yamagata Prefecture: Viscount Mishima Michitsune

Events

References

 
1880s in Japan
Japan
Years of the 19th century in Japan